Safar Iranpak (23 December 1946 – 30 January 2009) was an Iranian football striker who played for Persepolis and the Iran national football team.

Early life
He was born in Masjed Soleyman on 23 December 1946. He started his playing career for his hometown team Shahin Ahvaz at the age of 12.

Club career
He was promoted to the first team squad of Shahin Ahvaz and joined Persepolis in summer 1968. He played twelve seasons for Persepolis and is the best goalscorer at Tehran derby. He is also the third all-time goalscorer of Persepolis.

International career

He was invited to the Iran national football team in 1971 and was a part of the title winning team at the 1972 AFC Asian Cup. One of his best international games was against North Korea, where he scored twice and led Iran to qualify for the 1972 Summer Olympics. He retired from national football in 1975.

After retirement and death
After he retired from football in 1980, he moved to Stockholm, Sweden where he died on 30 January 2009 from lung cancer. His body was sent to Ahwaz to be buried in the Behesht-Abad cemetery.

Honours

Club

Iranian Football League:
Winners (3): 1971–72 1973–74, 1975–76
Runners-up (3): ''1974–75, 1976–77, 1977–78
Espandi Cup:
Winner: 1979

International
AFC Asian Cup:
Winners (1): 1972

See also

References

External links

1947 births
2009 deaths
Iranian footballers
Iran international footballers
Persepolis F.C. players
shahin Ahvaz players
Deaths from lung cancer
Deaths from cancer in Sweden
Olympic footballers of Iran
1972 AFC Asian Cup players
Footballers at the 1972 Summer Olympics
AFC Asian Cup-winning players
People from Masjed Soleyman
Association football forwards
Sportspeople from Khuzestan province